The Milk of Dreams is the main art exhibition of the 2022 Venice Biennale.

Further reading 

 
 
 
 
 
 
 
 
 https://news.artnet.com/art-world/guide-to-the-witches-of-the-venice-biennale-2101401

April 2022 events in Italy
59th Venice Biennale